Carlos Fernando Angulo Parra (born 11 September 1950) is a Mexican politician and lawyer affiliated with the PAN. He currently serves as Deputy of the LXII Legislature of the Mexican Congress representing Chihuahua.

References

1950 births
Living people
People from Ciudad Juárez
National Action Party (Mexico) politicians
21st-century Mexican politicians
Politicians from Chihuahua (state)
Universidad Iberoamericana alumni
Universidad Autónoma de Ciudad Juárez alumni
Academic staff of Universidad Iberoamericana
Academic staff of Universidad Autónoma de Ciudad Juárez
Academic staff of the Monterrey Institute of Technology and Higher Education
Deputies of the LXII Legislature of Mexico
Members of the Chamber of Deputies (Mexico) for Chihuahua (state)